PRIX EUROPA – The European Broadcasting Festival – is the Europe's largest annual tri-medial festival and competition. The event takes place in the third week of October in Berlin, Germany.

PRIX EUROPA awards the best European Television, Radio and Online productions each year with the aim of publishing them throughout Europe and supporting their continental distribution and use.  The festival calls on media professionals to compete against each other with their best productions.

The festival is hosted by the German broadcaster Rundfunk Berlin-Brandenburg (RBB).

History
Set up by the Council of Europe and the European Cultural Foundation in 1987 it now has the backing of 30 partners – including institutions like the European Parliament, the European Broadcasting Union (EBU), the European Alliance for Television and Culture, the Land Berlin, the Land Brandenburg, the Rundfunk Berlin-Brandenburg (RBB), the Medienanstalt Berlin-Brandenburg, the Medienboard Berlin-Brandenburg, and the following European broadcasters:

ARTE, BBC Radio, Danish Broadcasting Company, Dutch Public Service Broadcaster, France Télévisions, Magyar Televízió, Norsk rikskringkasting, Österreichischer Rundfunk, Radio Télévision Belge Francophone, Raidió Teilifís Éireann, Radio Russia, SRG SSR, Sveriges Radio, Sveriges Television, Swedish Educational Broadcasting Company, Telewizja Polska S.A., Vlaamse Radio- en Televisieomroeporganisatie, Yleisradio, Zweites Deutsches Fernsehen, Česká televize, Deutschlandradio

In 1997, the Prix Futura Berlin, which had been launched in 1969, and the PRIX EUROPA merged turning the festival to support both television and radio productions. And additionally in 2000 the Dutch PRIX IRIS amalgamated with
PRIX EUROPA awarding the “Best European TV Programme of the Year about Cultural Diversity”.

Starting 2001, the online media has been represented with the award “The Best European Online Project of the Year “ and from 2016 onwards the Online Category productions will also be awarded with an honorary prize open to the entire PRIX EUROPA community via a web-based voting platform.

During the festival week, several broadcasting relevant special events are held for participants to the larger public together with local institutions and embassies.

PRIX EUROPA Categories 2018 
PRIX EUROPA's competition is held in several television, radio and online categories.

PRIX EUROPA distinguishes itself by its unique juries open to all programme makers across the continent. All competition entries are assessed and evaluated in a public and open debate. This transparent process makes PRIX Europa a first-class training platform and a multinational market place.

TELEVISION CATEGORIES:

TV Documentary
 Television documentaries up to 90 minutes.

TV Fiction 
 TV movies and mini-series
 TV fiction series and serials

The Current Affairs
 Journalistic research programs focusing on in-depth information and investigative journalism.

TV Iris Category – Under the Patronage of the Dutch Puclic Broadcaster – NTR
 An incentive for programme practitioners to devote their attention to the ethnic diversity aspect of European societies. Programmes can be fiction or documentaries, children or entertainment programmes that have “cultural diversity” as central theme.

PRIX GENEVE – European Alliance for Television and Culture – EATC
 The most innovation scripts of already produced television fiction programs written by newcomers.

RADIO CATEGORIES:

Radio Documentary 
 Single radio documentaries.

Radio Current Affairs
 Journalistic research programmes focusing on in-depth information and investigative journalism.

Radio Fiction
 Single radio drama programmes and episodes from series and serials.

Radio Music
 This category stands for innovation of programmes about music. It is looking for new ways of communicating music to audiences.

Digital Audio
 This new category aims to recognise the most creative audio presented on digital platforms. The jury will take into account the way the audio has been visualised for digital platforms, together with the impact and reach generated by social media and other digital syndication.

ONLINE CATEGORY:

Online Category
 Cross-platform projects, Web-based productions and Apps.

Deadline for submissions is 1 July 2016.

Journalist of the Year

• PRIX EUROPA OUTSTANDING ACHIEVEMENT AWARD

Awards

Each of the TV categories, Radio categories and the Best European Online Project of the Year winners is awarded the PRIX EUROPA Trophy, a certificate and 6,000 Euros.

The Online Community Award is an honorary recognition and the winner will receive a PRIX EUROPA Trophy but no prize money.

 PRIX EUROPA – Best European TV Documentary of the Year
 PRIX EUROPA – Best European TV Movie or Mini-Series of the Year
 PRIX EUROPA – Best European TV Fiction Series or Serial of the Year
 PRIX EUROPA – Best European TV Current Affairs Programme of the Year
 PRIX EUROPA IRIS – Best European TV Programme of the Year
 PRIX GENEVE – Most Innovative Television Fiction Script of the Year by a Newcomer
 PRIX EUROPA – Best European Radio Documentary of the Year
 PRIX EUROPA – Best European Radio Investigation of the Year
 PRIX EUROPA – Best European Radio Fiction of the Year
 PRIX EUROPA – Best European Radio Fiction Series or Serial of the Year
 PRIX EUROPA – Best European Radio Music Programme of the Year
 PRIX EUROPA – Best European Digital Audio of the Year
 PRIX EUROPA – The Best European Online Project of the Year
 PRIX EUROPA – Online Community Award

References

External links
PRIX EUROPA, retrieved 2016-11-21
PRIX EUROPA Regulations, retrieved 2016-06-20
PRIX EUROPA Submissions, retrieved 2016-06-20

Annual events in Berlin
Autumn events in Germany
European arts awards
German television awards
Film festivals in Berlin
Radio awards